Narthamalai, a cluster of small hills, is 25 km from Trichy on the Trichy-Pudukottai highway in the state of Tamil Nadu, India. Here can be seen some of the  oldest  rock cut cave temples, as well as  the longest rock-cut edicts, similar to Asokan edicts  and  extremely rare in the south of India.
The town houses Vijayalaya Choleeswaram built during the 9th century. The two rock-cut temples are classic examples of how temple architecture styles were fusing in different parts of the country.

History

Narthamalai was ruled from the 7th to 9th centuries by the Mutharaiyars, who were feudatories of the Pallavas. The region was later captured by Medieval Cholas. Though the temple is called Vijayalaya Choleeswaram, the temple was originally built by Muttaraiyar lieutenant, Sattan Paliyili, during the seventh regnal year of Pallava king Nripatungavarman during 862 CE. As per some accounts, the temple is believed to have been built by the first king of Medieval Cholas, Vijayalaya Chola (848- 891 CE), but the view is highly debated. As per the inscriptions, immediately after the construction, the temple was damaged by rains and lightning. The restoration work was carried out by Tennavan Tamiladirayan.

In modern times, the temple is maintained and administered by archaeological department of India as a protected monument.

The place was called Telinga-kula-kala-puram in the 11th century during the times of Rajaraja Chola I and his son Rajendra Chola I.

Tourism
Narthamalai is located 11 miles Northeast West of Pudukottai  in the state of Tamil Nadu, India. The cave temples of Narthamalai have stood the test of time. Its beautifully carved pillars and statues will never give away that these temples date all the way back to the early medieval era. Narthamalai has six large, skillfully carved of Lord Vishnu in the central hall. A life size portrait of Lord Vishnu will leave the visitors speechless with the levels of skill, effort and the time taken to create it.

The Vijayalaya Choleswara temple at Narthamalai is the most beautiful structure in Narthamalai hills. Vijayalaya Choleeswaram is dedicated to the Hindu god Shiva. Constructed in the Nagara style of architecture and rock cut architecture, the temple is believed to have been built during the 9th century by Muttaraiyar kings, the cardinals of Pallavas, with later expansion from the Cholas. The rock-cut architecture is an early example of Chola Art, continuing the tradition of the Pallavas. The other portions of Narthamalai houses the 8th century Jaina Abode, the Aluruttimalai Jain Caves. There are also two rock-cut caves, one of which houses twelve life size sculptures of Vishnu. The temple is considered one of the oldest stone temples in South India.

A manifestation of ancient Tamil culture, the Narthamalai temples is just one of your tutors if you want learn more about one of the oldest living civilization.

There is another Historical event occurred here, the Thanjai Perya kovil was built with the stones taken from this mountain only, during Chola's Empire.

See also
Indian rock-cut architecture

Notes

Caves of Tamil Nadu
Tourist attractions in Tamil Nadu
Archaeological sites in Tamil Nadu
Villages in Pudukkottai district